The loins, or lumbus, are the sides between the lower ribs and pelvis, and the lower part of the back. The term is used to describe the anatomy of humans and quadrupeds, such as horses, pigs, or cattle.  The anatomical reference also applies to particular cuts of meat, including tenderloin or sirloin steak.

Human anatomy
In human anatomy the term "loin" or "loins" refers to the side of the human body below the rib cage to just above the pelvis. It is frequently used to reference the general area below the ribs. While the term "loin" is generally not used in medical science, some disorders do include the term.

The lumbar region of the spinal column is located in the loin area of the body.

Society and culture
In contemporary usage the term appears primarily in two contexts: where loins are "girded" in preparation for a challenge, or else euphemistically referring to human genitals. In literature or poetry, to feel a "stirring" in one's loins may suggest sexual excitement.

The word "loincloth" in the Bible, is used to refer to an item of clothing which covers the loins. The "fruit" of one's loins refers to offspring, and "fruit of my loins" also appears in the King James Version.

Loins may refer generally to the lower area of the body, much like the term "below the belt" derives from a belt worn at the waist.

When the long tunic of the Ancient era was the typical garment, the phrase "gird one's loins" described the process of raising and securing the lower portion of the tunic between one's legs to increase mobility for work or battle. In the modern age, it has become an idiom meaning to prepare oneself for action, as in:

Loins in butchery 

Butchers refer to the section of meat below the rib cage, but above the round (in a carcass hanging from the head end) as loin.
Various names of meats further butchered from the loin section of cattle and pig contain the name "loin" such as tenderloin and sirloin. In American butchery of beef, the loin section of beef is further divided and named sirloin, top sirloin, short loin and tenderloin.

In the British butchery of beef, the same section is generally referred to as the "rump".

Cuts of pork of this section include pork loin and pork tenderloin.

It has been suggested by culinary professionals that tenderloin is the most tender cut of beef one can get. The loin section of beef is fairly popular among consumers for its low fat qualities. It is the source of filet mignon.

See also 
 
 Loincloth
 Groin

References 

Vertebrate anatomy

pt:Quadril